Wrexham County Borough in north-east Wales, is divided into forty-nine electoral wards for Wrexham County Borough Council elections since the 2022 election. Seven of the electoral wards have two councillors. This is the second set of electoral boundaries since the council's formation, with the first set used between 1995 and 2022.

2022 ward changes 
On 23 June 2016, the Local Democracy and Boundary Commission for Wales was asked by the then Welsh Cabinet Secretary for Finance and Local Government to restart its boundary reviews of the 22 local authorities local government ward boundaries, with the review expected to be completed for the 2022 local elections.

A public consultation ahead of any draft proposals was held between 15 October 2018 and 7 January 2019.

On 6 January 2020, the commission published its draft proposals, and held another consultation for 12 weeks between 14 January 2020 to 6 April 2020. Due to the COVID-19 pandemic in Wales, the consultation was prematurely suspended on 27 March 2020, and reopened from the 1 July 2020 to 13 July 2020.

Draft proposals 
Under draft proposals, the LDBCW proposed a 55-member council (increase of 3), and 48 electoral wards (increase of 1), with 7 being two-councillor wards. 22 wards would be retained.

Final proposals 
Under final proposals, the LDBCW proposed a 56-member council, up 1 from the draft proposal and 4 from the existing configuration. An extra ward would be added to the proposals, to a total of 49 wards, compared to the pre-existing 47 wards. 24 wards would be retained, up from the proposed 22 in the draft proposals.

In July 2021, the Welsh Government accepted the various ward change proposals made by the Local Democracy and Boundary Commission for Wales, with only slight modification, for Wrexham County Borough. The number of electoral wards would increase from 47 to 49. The number of councillors will increase by four, from 52 to a total of 56, giving an average of 1,801 electors per councillor. These took effect from May 2021 following the election. The changes gave a better parity of representation. The Welsh Government rejected three recommendations on the names of three wards. Twenty-four wards remained unchanged. Seven wards have two councillors, up from four wards having two councillors in 2017. The changes came into force following the passing of The County Borough of Wrexham (Electoral Arrangements) Order 2021.

Of the other wards, and not mentioning minor boundary changes, the major changes are:

 New wards; Acrefair North (from Plas Madoc ward and Cefn community), Bangor Is-y-Coed and Rhos.
 Acton ward expanded to include Maesydre as Acton and Maesydre
 Bronington ward expanded to include Hanmer as Bronington and Hanmer
 Bryn Cefn expanded to include parts of Brynteg ward
 Gwenfro ward expanded to include parts of New Broughton and Brynteg wards
 Parts of Abenbury wards moved to Whitegate ward, parts of Whitegate ward (near Newton Street) moved to Smithfield ward, and parts of Smithfield ward moved to Wynnstay ward
 Split Cefn ward (a two councillor ward) into separate East and West wards (one councillor each), as Cefn East and Cefn West.
 Refer to the dually named Dyffryn Ceiriog/Ceiriog Valley ward by only its Welsh name, Dyffryn Ceiriog
 Parts of Offa ward transferred to Erddig ward
 Parts of Brynyffynnon ward transferred to Offa ward
 Split Gwersyllt East and South (a two councillor ward) into separate East and South wards (one councillor each), as Gwersyllt East and Gwersyllt South
 Abolish Johnstown ward, Plas Madoc ward, and Maesydre ward
 Overton ward expanded to include Maelor South as Overton and Maelor South
 Pant ward merged with Johnstown ward as Pant and Johnstown with two councillors.
 Various minor boundary changes
 Shrink the Ponciau ward, removing one of its two councillors.
 Wards of Acton and Maesydre (merged ward), Brymbo, Pant and Johnstown (merged ward), Rhosnesni, and Rossett, become two-councillor wards.
 Introduction of Welsh-language names used alongside English-language names for some wards.

No changes performed on the following wards:

List of electoral wards

Between 1995 and 2022 
The table following lists the electoral wards used between 1995 and 2022, with their incumbents before the May 2022 election.

See also 
 Mayor of Wrexham
 List of places in Wrexham County Borough
 Community (Wales)
 List of communities in Wales#Wrexham

Notes

References 

Lists of wards in Wales